Claude Galopin is a French automotive engineer.

Career
In , Galopin was recruited by the Ligier Formula One team as a race engineer, a position he remained in for four years. He then stepped down to International Formula 3000 to work for the GBDA Motorsport team, whose driver Olivier Grouillard finished second in the 1988 Drivers' Championship.

He designed the  Ligier JS35 chassis with Richard Divila, but the car's performance was disappointing and he was summarily fired by team owner Guy Ligier. For 1992 he returned to Formula 3000 with the DAMS team—which, like GBDA, was part owned by former driver René Arnoux—where he engineered Olivier Panis and Jean-Christophe Boullion to the 1993 and 1994 championships. Galopin worked for DAMS until 2002, during which time he also designed the team's unraced GD-01 chassis intended for F1, before moving to Pescarolo Sport.

References

Living people
Year of birth missing (living people)
Formula One engineers
French automobile designers
French motorsport people